The 2018 Canberra Challenger was a professional tennis tournament played on outdoor hard courts. It was the third edition of the tournament which was a part of the 2018 ATP Challenger Tour. It took place in Canberra, Australia between 8 and 13 January 2018.

Singles main-draw entrants

Seeds

 1 Rankings are as of January 1, 2017.

Other entrants
The following players received wildcards into the singles main draw:
 Alexander Crnokrak
 Benjamin Mitchell
 Dane Propoggia
 Gavin van Peperzeel

The following players received entry from the qualifying draw:
 Jeremy Beale
 Harry Bourchier
 Thomas Fancutt
 Nathan Pasha

Champions

Singles

  Andreas Seppi def.  Márton Fucsovics 5–7, 6–4, 6–3.

Doubles

  Jonathan Erlich /  Divij Sharan def.  Hans Podlipnik Castillo /  Andrei Vasilevski 7–6(7–1), 6–2.

External links
Official Website

2018 ATP Challenger Tour
Canberra Challenger
2018 in Australian tennis